Virginia Young may refer to:

Virginia S. Young (1917–1994), American politician
Virginia R. Young, American mathematician
Virginia Young (weight thrower), American track athlete and two-time champion at the USA Indoor Track and Field Championships
Virginia Young (heptathlete), Australian heptathlete